Nicola Ann "Nicki" Harding (born 12 June 1982) is an English female football defender. She last played for Manchester City Ladies in the FA WSL, having been part of Liverpool's squad in the 2011 FA WSL and 2012 FA WSL. Although primarily a full-back, comfortable on either the right or left, she can also play in a more advanced midfield role.

Club career
Harding left Everton Ladies to join Blackburn Rovers Ladies in the 2007 close season. She had spent three summers playing in the American W-League with New Hampshire Lady Phantoms. In August 2010 Harding played for Liverpool Ladies in the pre-season Preston Tournament, scoring the winning goal in the final.

International career
Harding represented England at U19 level.

Statistics

Honours
Manchester City
Women's League Cup: 2014

References

External links
Profile at Liverpool LFC website

English women's footballers
Everton F.C. (women) players
Liverpool F.C. Women players
Blackburn Rovers L.F.C. players
1982 births
Living people
FA Women's National League players
Women's Super League players
Manchester City W.F.C. players
Women's association football defenders